Olympia Park Stadion is a multi-purpose stadium located in Rustenburg, South Africa. Not to be confused with the Royal Bafokeng Stadium, where the 2010 FIFA World Cup games were played, it is currently used mostly for football and rugby matches; it was utilized as a training field for teams participating in the 2010 FIFA World Cup.

Notable matches

1995 Rugby World Cup 
During the 1995 Rugby World Cup, the stadium hosted three group-stage matches.

The stadium irregularly hosts ABSA Premiership games.

Cricket

Cricket ground

References

See also
 List of stadiums in South Africa
 List of African stadiums by capacity

Rugby union stadiums in South Africa
Rugby World Cup stadiums
Soccer venues in South Africa
Sports venues in North West (South African province)
Sports venues completed in 1989
Rustenburg